KSRM (920 AM) is a commercial radio station programming talk in Soldotna, Alaska, broadcasting to the Kenai, Alaska, area.

References

External links

SRM
Talk radio stations in the United States
Radio stations established in 1967